Rui Miguel Marques Baião (born 4 September 1980) is a Portuguese former footballer who played as a midfielder.

Club career
Born in Montijo, Setúbal District, Baião joined S.L. Benfica's youth system at the age of 15, making his senior debuts with the B-team in the third division. His maiden appearance in the Primeira Liga occurred on 8 April 2001, as he started in a 3–0 home win against C.S. Marítimo on 8 April 2001, and he scored the first of three goals in the competition during his career on 20 May of that year in a 1–1 draw at S.C. Salgueiros.

After terminating his contract, Baião was supposed to sign with FC Porto via Varzim S.C. but it never materialized. From 2002 to 2011 he alternated between the top flight and the second level, representing Varzim, C.F. Estrela da Amadora, Gil Vicente FC, Portimonense SC, S.C. Olhanense and C.D. Fátima. He also had a brief stint in Greece, with A.O. Kerkyra.

Baião retired in January 2014 whilst at the service of lower league side C.D. Pinhalnovense, due to a heart condition. He was 33 years old.

References

External links

1980 births
Living people
People from Montijo, Portugal
Portuguese footballers
Association football midfielders
Primeira Liga players
Liga Portugal 2 players
Segunda Divisão players
S.L. Benfica B players
F.C. Alverca players
S.L. Benfica footballers
Varzim S.C. players
C.F. Estrela da Amadora players
Gil Vicente F.C. players
Portimonense S.C. players
S.C. Olhanense players
C.D. Fátima players
C.D. Pinhalnovense players
Super League Greece players
Football League (Greece) players
A.O. Kerkyra players
Portugal youth international footballers
Portuguese expatriate footballers
Expatriate footballers in Greece
Portuguese expatriate sportspeople in Greece
Sportspeople from Setúbal District